The 1993 British Formula Three season was the 43rd British Formula Three Championship, won by Kelvin Burt. The season started on 21 March at Silverstone and ended at Thruxton on 10 October at  following fifteen races. Paul Stewart Racing were forced to switch Burt from a Reynard to a Dallara chassis in order to stave off the challenge of Oliver Gavin, who had been using a Dallara since the fourth round. The season marked the beginning of the Italian firm's domination of the series — Dallara chassis have won every British F3 title since. Class B was won by British driver Jamie Spence.

Drivers and Teams

Race calendar and results

Championship Standings

Points in brackets include dropped scores — only the best 12 of 15 scores count towards the championship

Source:

References

External links
 The official website of the British Formula 3 Championship

Formula Three
British Formula Three Championship seasons